The Bath in the Barn is a 1956 Austrian-West German comedy film directed by Paul Martin and starring Sonja Ziemann, Paul Klinger and Herta Staal. It is a remake of the 1943 film of the same title.

It was shot at the Spandau Studios in Berlin. The film's sets were designed by the art director Rolf Zehetbauer.

Cast

References

Bibliography

External links 
 

1956 films
West German films
1950s German-language films
Films directed by Paul Martin
Remakes of German films
Films set in the 17th century
Films set in Flanders
German historical comedy films
Austrian historical comedy films
1950s historical comedy films
Films shot at Spandau Studios
1950s German films